Hustler TV may refer to

 Hustler TV (US), an American semi-hardcore pornographic pay-per-view television service
 Hustler TV Canada, a Canadian hardcore pornographic pay-TV service
 Hustler TV (Europe), a European hardcore pornographic pay-TV service

See also
 Blue Hustler, a related European softcore erotic pay-TV service
 Hustler HD (also known as Hustler HD 3D), a related European 3DTV and HDTV hardcore erotic pay-TV service
 Hustler (disambiguation)